Francesco Bertelli (1794–1844) was an Italian astronomer at the observatory of Bologna and professor of astronomy at the University of Bologna. The main-belt asteroid 8266 Bertelli is named after him.

References

1794 births
1844 deaths
19th-century Italian astronomers
Academic staff of the University of Bologna